T Antliae (also abbreviated T Ant) is a Classical Cepheid variable star that is between 10 and 12,000 light-years away from the Sun in the constellation of Antlia. A yellow-white supergiant with a spectral type of F6Iab, it ranges between apparent magnitude 8.86 and 9.76 over a period of 5.89820 days.

Variability

T Antliae varies in brightness regularly every 5.89820 days.  The light curve is extremely consistent and shows a rapid rise taking 23% of the period, with a slower decline.  The maximum brightness of apparent magnitude 8.86 and the minimum of 9.76 are also extremely consistent.

The amplitude, light curve shape, period, and consistency, all mark T Antliae as a Cepheid variable.  However, the exact sub-type has been debated.  It has been considered a type II Cepheid, and old population II star, but is now thought to be a younger more massive Classical Cepheid variable, also known as a δ Cepheid.

The period has been calculated to be increasing by about half a second per year.  The increasing period implies that the effective temperature of T Antliae is decreasing, something that would happen both during the initial crossing of the instability strip after a star has left the main sequence, and again following a blue loop.  The first crossing of the instability strip is very rapid and T Antliae is judged to be crossing it for the third time (the second time occurs with increasing temperature at the start of the blue loop).

The brightness changes of Cepheid variables are caused by pulsations in their outer layers, causing both the temperature and radius to change. The temperature, and hence the spectral type, also vary. Spectral types between F6 and G5 have been published for T Antliae.

Stellar system 
The timing of the light variations of T Antliae show a small scatter which can be fitted to a sine curve.  This has been proposed to be due to light travel time caused by orbital movement of the variable star.  This is based on somewhat uncertain data from old photograph records, and there is no confirmation of a companion.  A compatible orbit would take 42.4 years to complete, with a semimajor axis around 10.8 Astronomical Units.

A sparse open cluster lies around the position of T Antliae.  Fitting of isochrones to the brighter stars shows a main sequence turnoff consistent with the position of T Antliae in the H-R diagram.  The bluest stars in the cluster, and T Antliae itself, best match an isochrone of 100 million years.  Fitting to redder stars in the cluster gives an age of around 79 million years.

References 

Antlia
Binary stars
Classical Cepheid variables
F-type supergiants
Antliae, T
046924
Durchmusterung objects